Mohsen Yazdani (born January 8, 1969, in Tehran) is an Iranian bodybuilding champion. In 1999 he was the first Iranian bodybuilder to achieve the gold medal in world championships and in the same year also received the most advanced bodybuilder of the year award from (IFBB).  Yazdani is also the first ever Iranian bodybuilder to join IFBB pro. He is now active as the founder and CEO of Hirbod chain gyms.

Biography 
Mohsen Yazdani was born on January 8, 1969, in Tehran. When he was 12, he started his career in wrestling and in the same year he achieved the silver medal in the Tehran Youth Cup. He entered boxing when he was 16, and after he was done with his conscription he started his bodybuilding career by the advice of his friends Hamid Gheisari and Hadi Ghadir. He started his career in Olympic gym in 1991. He achieved his first medal ever by reaching third place in the national cup. A few months later he entered the national cup for the second time, and he was able to achieve the gold medal.

Awards and titles

National titles

Asian titles

International titles

World titles

Titles as Iran’s national team coach

References

External links 

 Official website

Iranian bodybuilders
1969 births
Living people